The Million Dollars (Swedish: Dollarmillionen) is a 1926 Swedish silent comedy film directed by Sigurd Wallén and starring Margita Alfvén, Richard Lund and Axel Hultman. It is based on Axel Essén's 1917 novel of the same name, later also turned into a 1942 Finnish film Dollari-miljoona. It was shot at the Råsunda Studios in Stockholm. The film's sets were designed by the art director Vilhelm Bryde.

Cast
 Margita Alfvén as Fylgia Falkman
 Richard Lund as Richard Bergin
 Fredrik Hedlund as Arthur Falkman 
 Axel Hultman as Simon Jakobovsky
 Constance Gibson as Mrs. Malla Falkman
 Albert Christiansen as Pricken Falkman
 Elsa Steinvall as Lojan Falkman
 Ivar Kåge as Baron af Segerlind
 Ester Roeck Hansen as Baron's Second Fiancée
 Georg Blomstedt as Drunken job applicant
 Anna Diedrich as Woman with Dog
 Thure Holm as Policeman
 Olof Krook as Process server
 Otto Malmberg as Customs officer
 Isa Quensel as Journalist 
 Edla Rothgardt as Seamstress
 Kurt Welin as Job applicant at Jakobovsky's

References

Bibliography
 Tommy Gustafsson. Masculinity in the Golden Age of Swedish Cinema: A Cultural Analysis of 1920s Films. McFarland, 2014.

External links

1926 comedy films
Swedish comedy films
1926 films
Films directed by Sigurd Wallén
Swedish silent films
Swedish black-and-white films
1920s Swedish films